Waskesiu River, is a river that runs through boreal forest in the north-central region of the Canadian province of Saskatchewan. It begins at Waskesiu Lake in Prince Albert National Park and flows north-east to Montreal Lake.

Description 
The source of Waskesiu River is at the north-eastern corner of Waskesiu Lake, just north of the village of Waskesiu Lake, in Prince Albert National Park. While the river itself is relatively short, it has a significant catchment area that includes the northern slopes of the Waskesiu Hills, Waskesiu Lake, and Kingsmere Lake. From Waskesiu Lake, Waskesiu River heads north-east out of the park and into the Northern Saskatchewan Administration District where it crosses Highway 2 en route to Montreal Lake in the Montreal Lake 106 Indian reserve.

In Prince Albert National Park, near the source of the river, is the Waskesiu River Trail. It is a  loop hiking trail that traverses the river bank and valley through forests of black spruce and aspen.

Waskesiu River Recreation Site 
Waskesiu River Recreation Site is a provincial recreation site and small campground on the northern banks of Waskesiu River. It is east of the Prince Albert National Park boundary and adjacent to the east side of Highway 2.

Fish species 
Fish commonly found in the river include the northern pike.

See also 
List of rivers of Saskatchewan
Hudson Bay drainage basin

References

External links 

Rivers of Saskatchewan
Tributaries of Hudson Bay
Prince Albert National Park